Bang Jae-ho is a South Korean actor and model. He is best known for his roles in dramas The King in Love, The Third Charm, School 2021 and Grand Prince. He also appeared in movies such as The Bad Guys: Reign of Chaos and Birthday.

Biography and career
He was born on June 21, 1992, in Seoul, South Korea. He completed his studies from Hankuk University of Foreign Studies Seoul Campus, he studied Chinese. After he graduated, he made his debut as an actor in 2016 and he also worked as an advertising model and he appeared in Samsung Galaxy S4 ZOOM and Maxim. After his debut as an actor, he appeared in a number of dramas such as The King in Love, Between Friendship and Love, Grand Prince and The Third Charm. He also appeared in movies Birthday and The Bad Guys: Reign of Chaos.

Filmography

Television series

Film

References

External links
 
 

1992 births
Living people
21st-century South Korean male actors
South Korean male models
South Korean male television actors
South Korean male film actors